is an Echizen Railway Mikuni Awara Line railway station located in the city of Sakai, Fukui Prefecture, Japan.

Lines

Station layout
The station consists of one side platform serving a single bi-directional track. The station is unattended, but there is a waiting area inside the wooden station building.

Adjacent stations

History
Mikuni-Minato Station was opened on July 1, 1914 as a freight terminal on the Japanese Government Railways Mikuni Line. Regular passenger operations began from December 15, 1927. JGR passenger operations ceased on October 11, 1944; however, Keifuku Electric Railway reopened the station as the terminus of the Mikuni Awara Line. Freight operations were discontinued by JNR on March 1, 1972 and the station was closed on June 25, 2001. The station reopened on August 10, 2003 under its present name as an Echizen Railway station.

Passenger statistics
In fiscal 2015, the station was used by an average of 156 passengers daily (boarding passengers only).

Surrounding area
To the south lies the mouth of the Kuzuryū River, which empties into the Sea of Japan. The port of Mikuni and some beaches are also nearby.
Prefectural Route 7 runs in front of the station. National Route 305 lies across the river.
Other points of interest include:
Mikuni Sunset Beach
Mikuni Hot Spring Yuaport
Mikuni Morning Market
Mikuni Yacht Harbor
Mikuni Sports Park
Takidanji Temple

See also
 List of railway stations in Japan

References

External links

  

Railway stations in Fukui Prefecture
Railway stations in Japan opened in 1927
Mikuni Awara Line
Sakai, Fukui